The following is a list of characters featured in The Saga of Seven Suns, a series of science fiction novels written by Kevin J. Anderson from 2002 to 2008.

For characters in the sequel trilogy The Saga of Shadows, see List of The Saga of Shadows characters.

Humans

Terran Hanseatic League
In the future, the human race has colonized multiple planets in the Spiral Arm, most of which are governed by the powerful Terran Hanseatic League (Hansa). Though ostensibly ruled by kings, the Hansa is actually controlled by its Chairman, and the puppet monarchs merely follow orders.

Hansa

Earth Defense Forces

Citizens

Therons
In the series, the most prominent human world aside from Earth is Theroc, a planet covered in semi-sentient worldtrees that is quietly independent from the Hansa. Theroc's "green priests" are able to commune with the trees and communicate telepathically across space when touching a treeling, making them indispensable for instantaneous communication across the galaxy.

Green priests

Royal family

Roamers
In the series, the Roamers are clans of industrious humans living a clandestine existence in the fringes of space, managing a profitable economy centered on the sale of the valuable stardrive fuel ekti and other commodities.

Ildirans
In the series, the Ildiran Empire has existed for over ten thousand years, living peacefully due to a communal mental interconnectedness called the thism. Each Ildiran has what is called a soulthread, and these soulthreads are woven together by their leader, the Mage-Imperator. Ildirans have a very specialized society, with specific castes that are adept at performing particular tasks. The castes are physically different from one another, and have different suffixes at the end of their names. Ildirans are the first extraterrestrials that humanity encounters upon exploring space beyond Earth, and the Ildirans share their stardrive technology with humans.

Nobles

Military officers

Other kiths

Artificial intelligence